Langadia (Greek: Λαγκάδια) or seldom Lagkadia may refer to the following places in Greece:

Langadia, Arcadia, a municipal unit in northwestern Arcadia
Langadia, Arta, a village in the Arta regional unit, part of the municipal unit Athamania
Langadia, Pella, a village in the Pella regional unit, part of the municipal unit Exaplatanos
Langadia, Trikala, a village in the Trikala regional unit, part of the municipal unit Paliokastro